Louisiana State Route 1 (LA 1) was one of the 98 original state highways that were established in 1924. It was signed for the Jefferson Highway, an auto trail that ran from New Orleans to Winnipeg. LA 1 curved through the entire state, spanning from Shreveport through Alexandria and Baton Rouge to New Orleans, ending south of Pointe a la Hache. It was renumbered for the most part as US 71 and US 171.

Route description
Beginning at a point on the Texas State Line, near Waskom, through Greenwood, Shreveport, Grand Cane, Mansfield, Sodus, Belmont, Marthaville, Robeline, Natchitoches, Montgomery, Colfax, ALexandria, Lecompte, Bunkie, Melville, Rosedale, Port Allen, Baton Rouge, Hope Villa, Burnside, Convent, Kenner, Shrewsbury, Protection Levee at South Claiborne Avenue, New Orleans, Louisiana, South Claiborne Avenue both sides to Canal Street, North Claiborne Avenue both sides to Poland Avenue, St. Claude Avenue, both sides to St. Bernard Parish Line, Mereaux, Violet, Poydras, Dalcour, Phoenix, Point-a-la-hache to Fort St. Philip. - 1924 Louisiana Legislative Route Description

As the successor to the Jefferson Highway, LA 1 started a little further south than the Jefferson Highway, but was the same route, more or less. LA 1 began in Pointe-a-la-Hache, continuing north through small communities, making its way to New Orleans. The route description from New Orleans north is as follows:

From the southern terminus at Common Street, LA 1 followed St. Charles Avenue, Canal Street, City Park Avenue, and Metairie Road into Jefferson Parish. Leaving New Orleans, LA 1 followed Metairie Road, Shrewsbury Road, and Jefferson Highway to Kenner.

From Kenner to Geismar, LA 1 followed alongside the east bank levee of the Mississippi River which, due to various sections of levee being relocated during the 1920s and 1930s, is often a significant distance removed from the modern River Road. Also, a two-mile section between Norco and Montz was eliminated in 1935 when the parallel Airline Highway bridge across the Bonnet Carré Spillway was opened. Portions of LA 1 at Reserve and Gramercy are still known as Jefferson Highway to this day.

From Geismar to Baton Rouge, the route followed what is known as Old Jefferson Highway to downtown Baton Rouge. The original routing through downtown Baton Rouge followed Claycut Road, South Acadian Thruway, Government Street, 19th Street, and North Street to the former Mississippi River ferry landing to Port Allen.

From Port Allen to Alexandria, LA 1 used Court Street, North Jefferson Avenue, and Rosedale Road through Port Allen, then along Rosedale Road to Rosedale, Ravenswood, and then to Red Cross. LA 1 crossed the Atchafalaya River by ferry to Melville and continued on to Lebeau.
It used the current route of US 71 to Bunkie, with a short section over a one-lane truss bridge that was bypassed in the mid-1930s. North of Cheneyville, it used US 71 and parts of some bypassed roads to Chambers, then Old Baton Rouge Highway to Alexandria.

In Alexandria and Pineville, LA 1 used Jefferson Hwy., Lee Street, Main Street, and Murray Street through Alexandria, then LA 1 crossed the Red River on a now-demolished bridge at the foot of Murray Street into Pineville, then Main Street and Military Highway, Jefferson Highway, and US 71 (Shreveport Highway) through Pineville.

North of Pineville, LA 1 used US 71 and Shreveport Highway. (Stainaker Street is a small, severed portion of the original route near the junction of US 71 and LA 3225.) Numerous curves were straightened along the route, including a bypassed route through Colfax. North of Colfax, LA 1 followed US 71 north to Clarence, then over on LA 6 to Robeline, then on LA 1 to Belmont, via Old Jefferson Road north of Pelican) to Mansfield, following Old Jefferson Highway into town.

US 171 carried LA 1 to Shreveport, via Old Jefferson Road through Stonewall and Old Mansfield Road through Keithville. Once through Shreveport, LA 1 used US 79-US 80 (Greenwood Road) to Greenwood Road, then US 80 (Texas Avenue) across the state line toward Waskom, Texas.

Major intersections (Poydras to Melville)

Major intersections (Melville to Natchitoches)

References
Louisiana Maps from 1955

Former state highways in Louisiana